Hawley is a surname. Notable people with the surname include:

Academics
 Amos Hawley (1910–2009), American sociologist
 Anne Hawley, American museum director
 Florence M. Hawley, Mexican anthropologist
 James Edwin Hawley (1897–1965), Canadian geologist
 Katherine Hawley, British philosopher
 Ken Hawley (1927–2014), British tool specialist
 Owen Hawley (1930–2006), American literature professor and historian
 William Hawley (1851–1941), British archaeologist

Artists
 Carl Tracy Hawley (1873–1945), American painter
 Margaret Foote Hawley (1880–1963), American painter
 Michael Hawley (1961-2020), American artist and researcher in digital media

Businesspeople
 Jesse Hawley (merchant), American backer of the Erie Canal
 Kip Hawley, American businessman and administrator

Clergy
 Gideon Hawley (1727–1807), American missionary to the Iroquois Indians
 William Dickinson Hawley (1784–1845), American clergyman

Military people
 David Hawley (1741–1807), Stratfield, Connecticut, captain and privateer during the American Revolution
 Henry Hawley (c. 1679–1759), British army officer
 Nero Hawley (1742–1817), Trumbull, Connecticut, slave who fought in American Revolution to earn his freedom
 Richard E. Hawley (born 1942), American Air Force general
 Robert Hawley, (1729–1799), Trumbull, Connecticut, captain and privateer during the American Revolutionary War
 William Hawley (general) (1824–1873), American Union Army general
Willis Nichols Hawley (1875–1898), American soldier during the Spanish–American War

Performers
 C. B. Hawley (1858–1915), American musician and composer
 Graeme Hawley (born 1973), English actor
 Ida Hawley (1876–1908), Canadian actress and singer
 Ormi Hawley (1889–1942), American actress
 Richard Hawley (born 1967), English musician
 Ryan Hawley (born 1985), English actor
 Wanda Hawley (1895–1963), American actress

Politicians
 Charles Hawley (1792–1866), American politician
 Donald Hawley (1921–2008), British colonial lawyer, diplomat and writer
 Dwight Hawley (1896–1981), American politician
 George Douglas Hawley (1841–1934), Canadian politician
 Henry Hawley (colonial administrator) (fl.1630), British governor of Barbados
 Jack Hawley (1920–1999), American politician
 James H. Hawley (1847–1929), governor of Idaho
 Joseph Roswell Hawley (1826–1905), American journalist and politician, governor of Connecticut
 Josh Hawley (b 1979), American politician and current US Senator
 Robert B. Hawley (1849–1921), American businessman and politician
 Spencer Hawley (b. 1953), American politician
 Stephen Hawley (born c.1947), American businessman and politician
 Willis C. Hawley, American politician and co-sponsor of the Smoot-Hawley Tariff of 1930

Space exploration
 Steven Hawley (born 1951), NASA mission-specialist astronaut
 Todd B. Hawley (1961–1995), American co-founder of the International Space University

Sportspeople
 Chuck Hawley (1915–1992), American baseball and basketball player
 Colin Hawley (born 1987), American rugby union player
 David Hawley (rugby league), British rugby league footballer
 Frank Hawley (born 1954), Canadian drag-racing driver
 Frank Hawley (cricketer) (1877–1913), English cricketer
 Fred Hawley (1890–1954), English footballer
 Jesse Hawley (American football) (1887–1946), American college football coach
 Karl Hawley (born 1981), English footballer
 Kevin Hawley (born 1980), Anguillan footballer
 Pink Hawley (1872–1938), American baseball player
 Sandy Hawley, (born 1949), Canadian jockey

Writers
 Alix Hawley (born 1975), Canadian author
 Cameron Hawley (1905–1969), American fiction writer
 Caroline Hawley (born 1967), British journalist
 Elizabeth Hawley (1923–2018), American journalist
 Noah Hawley, American film and television producer, screenwriter, composer, and author

Others
 Alan Hawley (disambiguation)
 John Hawley (disambiguation)
 Joseph Hawley (disambiguation)
 Justice Hawley (disambiguation)
 Nancy Miriam Hawley, activist
 Thomas Hawley (disambiguation)

English-language surnames